The Boo was the first book by writer Pat Conroy.  Written when Conroy was newly graduated (1967) from The Citadel in 1970, it is a collection of letters,  short stories, and anecdotes about Lt. Colonel Thomas "The Boo" Courvoisie. As Commandant of Cadets at the Citadel. Courvoisie was a friend and father figure to many of the college's cadets, including Conroy.

References 

1970 short story collections
American short story collections
Books by Pat Conroy